Statistics of Belgian First Division in the 1898–99 season.

Overview

This season saw a number of new clubs enter the Championship. along with a new format.
It was contested by 9 teams, and F.C. Liégeois won the championship.

League standings

Championship Group A

Championship Group B
Only the rankings are known.

Final

See also
1898–99 in Belgian football

References

External links
Belgian clubs history

1898
1898–99 in European association football leagues
1898–99 in Belgian football